Chef Academy is a reality television series which premiered on November 16, 2009, on Bravo and ran for nine episodes until November 1, 2010. The show followed Jean Christophe Novelli, a chef with restaurants in London, France and South Africa. On the show, he opened a test program for a culinary institute in Los Angeles.

Contestants
There were nine students competing in Chef Academy. Names, ages, and hometowns below are from the Bravo website.
Carissa St. Aubin, 26 – Charlotte, N.C.
Emmanuel DelCour, 27 – Bordeaux, France and residing in Venice, California
Kyle Daley, 29 – Salt Lake City, Utah and residing in San Diego, California
Kyle Kupiszewski (Kup), 27 – Allentown, Pennsylvania
Leonard Goodloe (Leo), 28 – San Antonio, T.X.
Sarah Jacobsen, 28 – Wheeling, Illinois
Suzanne Winn, 47 – Mission Viejo, California
Tracie Norfleet, 46 – Venice, California
Zoe Feigenbaum, 26 – New York, N.Y.

Although Chef Academy never had a true winner of the show, Kyle Daley was announced Best Chef of Chef Academy. It was announced on the final episode of the season.

Format
The students are assessed weekly tests varying from preparing desserts to gutting a fish or usually recreating one of Novelli's dishes. At the end of the test, Novelli determines who passes and who fails. If a student fails three tests, they are dismissed from his Academy.

Location
The building used to house the academy is 1304 Abbot Kinney Boulevard, Venice, CA.

Contestant table

Notes
1 The students who failed the first episode did not count as their first failure. 
2 Chef Novelli did not reveal the results for all the chefs except for the three who performed the best (Zoe, Kyle, and Kup) who were invited to join him at a beach party. 
3 The chefs who passed each made a croque-em-bouche for extra credit. Tracie was declared 'Head of the Class' because she impressed Chef Novelli the most this week. 
4 Although both Sarah and Suzanne received their third failures, Chef Novelli decided to give them another chance. 
5 Although Suzanne had failed the Chef Academy, Chef Novelli asked her back for Episode 9 to host the gala for the final challenge.

Key
 The student passed that episode's test
 The student failed that episode's test
 (FAIL) The student received three strikes and failed Chef Academy
 (PASS) The student passed Chef Academy

Episodes

References

External links
 Official website
 

2000s American reality television series
2009 American television series debuts
Food reality television series
Bravo (American TV network) original programming
2010s American reality television series
2010 American television series endings